Guilherme Rodrigues Moreira (born 11 April 1987), commonly known as Moreira, is a Brazilian professional footballer who plays for Thai club Bankhai United.

Club career

Budapest Honved
Moreira made his debut of 27 September 2008 against Újpest FC in a match that ended 1-1.

Club honours

Budapest Honvéd FC
 Hungarian Cup: 2008–09
 Hungarian Super Cup runners-up: 2009

References
 Profile at Soccerway
 Player profile at HLSZ
 Moreira at ZeroZero
 Moreira at Footballdatabase

External links 
Thaileague Official Website: MH Bankhai United F.C. Players

1987 births
Living people
People from Alegre, Espírito Santo
Brazilian footballers
Association football midfielders
CR Flamengo footballers
Coritiba Foot Ball Club players
Brazilian expatriate footballers
Expatriate footballers in Hungary
Budapest Honvéd FC players
Brazilian expatriate sportspeople in Hungary
Expatriate footballers in France
Clermont Foot players
Ligue 2 players
Song Lam Nghe An FC players
V.League 1 players
Brazilian expatriate sportspeople in France
Brazilian expatriate sportspeople in Vietnam
Expatriate footballers in Vietnam
Sportspeople from Espírito Santo